The history of the Jews in Kyrgyzstan is linked directly to the history of the Bukharian Jews of Uzbekistan. Until the 20th century, most Jews living in the Kyrgyz areas were of the Bukharian Jewish community. However, during the 20th century, large amounts of European Jews began to emigrate to Kyrgyzstan which was then part of the Soviet Union, and a small amount of them still live in the country.

Archeological findings suggests that Jewish traders from Khazaria started visiting the Kyrgyz territory around the 6th century CE.

In Kyrgyz tradition, the term "Djeet" was used in order to describe Jews, and it is mentioned in the Kyrgyz epic poem Manas, which dates back to the 10th century CE. In Manas, several central-Asian cities are described as having Jewish communities in them, among them Samarkand, Bukhara and Baghdad, though non of them have ever been inhabited by a majority of Kyrgyz people nor included in a Kyrgyz territory.

According to a census held in 1896, the Jews represented about 2% of the region total population. It can be assumed that almost 100% of these Jews were Bukharian Jews or at least Sephardic Jews, meaning no Ashkenazi Jews were living in the Kyrgyz area before the 20th century. During World War II many Jews fled from the European parts of the Soviet Union to central Asia, including Kyrgyzstan, making the Jewish community of Kyrgyzstan combined out of an Ashkenazi community and a Bukharian Sephardic one. The two communities functioned separately and though it did occasionally happen, Ashkenazi–Sephardi intermarriages were not common.

Bukharan Jews

Bukharan Jews, also known as "Bukharian Jews" or "Bukhari Jews" are Jews from Central Asia who speak Bukhori, a dialect of the Tajik language. Their name comes from the former Central Asian Emirate of Bukhara, which once had a sizable Jewish community. Since the dissolution of the Soviet Union, the great majority have emigrated to Israel and to the United States, while others have emigrated to Europe or Australia.

Medieval period

In his memoirs, Marco Polo mentions the existence of Jewish traders along the silk road which passed through modern day Kyrgyzstan, who built synagogues and spoke Aramaic. Famous Arab geographer Al-Maqdisi (946−1000) mentioned the cities of Osh, Uzgen, Taraz and others as having communities of Jews.

Modern period

Ashkenazi Jews first arrived to Kyrgyzstan with its conquest by the Russians. In the city of Karakol, one Jew was recorded in 1885. By 1900 there were seven Jews in the city and by 1910 the city had 31 Jewish inhabitants. While in 1885 Bishkek had eight Jews, by 1913 there were 43 Jews in Bishkek. The city of Osh had the biggest amount of Jews in Kyrgyzstan prior to the 20th century, due to its Sephardic Jewish community, which even had its own Jewish cemetery outside the city.

During the beginning of the 20th century, numerous Jewish Businessmen owned businesses in the Kyrgyz area − among them Yuri Davidov, who owned cotton factories in the Fergana valley, Boris Kagan who established a network of bookshops, and the Polyakov brothers who founded a branch of the "Azov-don commercial bank". Due to the need in doctors, teachers and engineers, many Ashkenazi Jews began to emigrate to Kyrgyzstan from European Russia.

Religious life

It is known that the Jewish community of Osh bought its Torah scrolls from its neighboring community of Uzbek Bukhara.

Until 1915, there were no synagogues in Kyrgyzstan. The nearest one was in Verniy, nowadays Almaty in Kazakhstan, Tashkent, Samarkand and Fergana in Uzbekistan. A separate Jewish cemetery operated only in Osh, while in all other cities Jews were buried in separate areas of the general Muslim/Christian cemeteries.

While there was no Jewish education in Kyrgyzstan, some of the Sephardic Jews in Osh sent their children to learn at the Heder in Samarkand. Ashkenazi Jews did not practice Judaism publicly, and sent their children to Russian schools.

After World War I 

After World War I, more and more Ashkenazi Jews came to Kyrgyzstan. Among them many representatives of different political parties who were exiled to central Asia, or government officials who were asked to work in rural areas such as Kyrgyzstan. With the 
 outbreak of the Communist  revolution, many political activists were sent to Kyrgyzstan to promote the communist ideas − many of whom were Jews or of Jewish origin, such as G. Broido who was chairman of the Bishkek city soviet, and Pinchasov, Lifschitz and Frei who were members of the local city soviets of Osh, Djahlal-Abad, and Tokmak. In 1920 the local ministry of education initiated a Jewish institute run by Simon Dimanshtein meant for alphabetization of Sephardic Jews. In 1929, Alexander Volodarsky, a former Yeshiva student from Vitebsk, became the leader of the Ashkenazi Jewish community of Osh, after being exiled from Belarus due to his religious practices.

World War II and on 

During the Second World War, more than 20,000 Ashkenazi Jews fled to Kyrgyzstan from the Nazi-occupied western parts of the Soviet Union. The Jewish Theater Company of Warsaw with the renowned actress Ida Kaminska (1899−1980) was evacuated to Bishkek until it was moved back to Europe after the war. During that time, the theater performed in Bishkek in Yiddish and Russian.

By 1945, some 70 Jews of the Bishkek community visited the local synagogue daily. On holidays, some 2,500 Jews visited the synagogue. Later, the synagogue began to host also Sephardic prayers for the city's Sephardi community. During the 1950s, the Jewish community of Bishkek reached about 3% of the total population of the city. Jews became dominant in the local university, clinics and schools, living mostly at the center of Bishkek. On other cities, smaller communities of Jews had lived also in the center mostly.

During the 1970s, some Jews began to emigrate to Israel, though the Soviet government made it hard for them to emigrate. Later on, and especially from 1989 and on, the vast majority of the Kyrgyzstan Jewish community emigrated to Israel, leaving around 500 Jews living nowadays in the country.

In 2000, Rabbi Arie Reichman, member of Alliance of Rabbis in Islamic States was sent by the Chabad movement to serve the Jewish community of Bishkek as Chief Rabbi, and nowadays there is a Jewish day school named "Pri Etz-Chaim", teaching some Hebrew and Jewish texts. The community is characterised by inter-religious marriage, and secular practice.

Cemeteries 

Jewish graves can be found at the Bishkek old and new cemeteries, in specific sections. Local cemetery workers usually know about these areas. In Djhalal-abad, at the local cemetery, Jewish graves are scattered all around the cemetery, marked usually by the Magen David sign.

See also
History of the Jews in Central Asia

References 

Jewish
Kyrgyzstan
Jews and Judaism in Kyrgyzstan
Kyrgyzstan